Jody-Anne Maxwell (born 1986) is from Kingston, Jamaica and was the winner of the 1998 Scripps National Spelling Bee at the age of 12. She made history as the first non-American to win the competition.

According to Ebony magazine, Maxwell, who was also the competition's first Black winner, was viewed as a celebrity on her return to Jamaica. Maxwell also attained significant fame in Jamaican communities within the United States.

Maxwell qualified for the Scripps competition by winning Jamaica's National Spelling Bee Championship, which her sister Janice had also won in 1990. Her prizes for winning the national bee included $10,000 cash, and an education trust fund of $11,000 (U.S).

She later went on to host the local Jamaican program The KFC Quiz Show with various co-hosts, (the first two being Dominique Lyew and Damar Pessoa) up until 2004 when the post was handed off to Samantha Strachan and Raine Manley Robertson.

Maxwell was also a contestant on Nickelodeon's game show Figure it Out in 1998. She successfully stumped the panel of judges for all three rounds.

In 2012 she attended the Norman Manley Law School at the University of the West Indies, Mona Campus.

Maxwell is also a past student of the prestigious Ardenne High School in Kingston, Jamaica.

See also
 List of Scripps National Spelling Bee champions

References

External links
New York Times article
James Maguire's book American Bee
Jamaica Trade Point page
Choices magazine article

Jamaican spellers
Spelling bee champions
Contestants on American game shows
Living people
Scripps National Spelling Bee participants
University of the West Indies alumni
People from Kingston, Jamaica
People associated with the Norman Manley Law School
1986 births